Juan Luis Quiñonez Lopez (born 14 May 1987 in Lima) is a Peruvian footballer who plays as a forward. He currently plays for FBC Melgar in the Peruvian First Division.

Career
Juan Quiñónez started his career playing in the youth divisions of Sporting Cristal. In 2005, he debuted with the first team. In 2006, he transferred to Universidad San Marcos in the 2nd division, playing with them until the first half of 2007. He later transferred to Sport Boys staying until 2008. In 2009, he transferred to his current club Sporting Cristal.

Quiñónez was part of the U-20 Peru squad that played in the 2007 South American Youth Championship.

References

External links
Juan Quiñónez at footballdatabase.eu

1987 births
Living people
Footballers from Lima
Association football forwards
Peruvian footballers
Sporting Cristal footballers
Sport Boys footballers
José Gálvez FBC footballers
FBC Melgar footballers